Lomechusa is a genus of beetles belonging to the family Staphylinidae.

The species of this genus are found in Europe and Japan. At least one species (Lomechusa pubicollis) is a highly specialized myrmecophile.

Species:
 Lomechusa atlantica (Koch, 1937) 
 Lomechusa barbarae (Schilow, 1977) 
 Lomechusa pubicollis (de Barneville, 1860)

References

Staphylinidae
Staphylinidae genera